Kolm may refer to:

Places
Kolm-e Bala, Iran
Kolm-e Pain, Iran
Kollum, a village in the Netherlands

Other uses
Kolm (surname)
KOLM, a radio station